Huo Yi ( 221–260s), courtesy name Shaoxian, was a military general of the state of Shu Han in the Three Kingdoms period of China. His father, Huo Jun, served under Liu Bei, the founding emperor of Shu. During his service under the Shu emperor Liu Shan, Huo Yi suppressed tribal rebellions in the restive Nanzhong region and maintained peace in the area. After Shu was conquered by its rival state Cao Wei in 263, Huo Yi surrendered to the Wei regime and was permitted to remain in charge of keeping the peace in Nanzhong. In return, Huo Yi became a Wei subject and presumably continued serving under the Jin dynasty, which replaced the Wei regime in 265.

Early life and career
Huo Yi's father was Huo Jun, a general who served under the warlord Liu Bei in the late Eastern Han dynasty and died sometime in the late 210s. In 221, Liu Bei declared himself emperor and established the state of Shu Han, after which he appointed Huo Yi as a taizi sheren (太子舍人; an attendant to the crown prince). Liu Bei died in 223 and was succeeded by his son Liu Shan, who appointed Huo Yi as an Internuncio (謁者) after his enthronement.

Between 227 and 234, when Shu's chancellor-regent Zhuge Liang was stationed in Hanzhong Commandery during the launching of a series of military campaigns against Shu's rival state Cao Wei, he requested for Huo Yi to be transferred to his office. Huo Yi worked together with Zhuge Liang's adoptive son Zhuge Qiao during this period of time.

Huo Yi was appointed as a Gentleman of the Yellow Gate (黃門侍郎) after Zhuge Liang died in 234. Later, when Liu Shan designated his son Liu Xuan as his heir apparent, he appointed Huo Yi as a zhongshuzi (中庶子; an aide) to Liu Xuan. Liu Xuan enjoyed horse-riding and archery and used to behave recklessly, but Huo Yi managed to use teachings from ancient classics to persuade Liu Xuan to improve his behaviour and he succeeded in doing so.

Service in the South
He was later reassigned to be in charge of military affairs in the Nanzhong region in the southern part of Shu. When the tribal peoples in Yongchang Commandery (永昌郡) caused trouble, Huo Yi was appointed as the Administrator of Yongchang and was ordered to lead troops to attack the tribes. Huo Yi achieved victory as he killed the tribal chiefs, destroyed their bases and restored peace at the borders of Yongchang. For his contributions, he was promoted to General Who Inspects the Army (監軍將軍) and appointed as the Administrator of Jianning Commandery (建寧郡), effectively being in charge of affairs in Nanzhong.

According to the Huayang Guo Zhi, Yan Yu (閻宇) of Nan commandery (南郡) was put in charge of governing the south after Zhang Biao's death during Shu Han early Jingyao (景耀; 258–261). To help him, Huo Yi born from the same commandery as Yan Yu served under him as his deputy. As his assistant, Huo Yi demonstrated exceptional aptitude therefore he succeeded Yan Yu in 263 as General Who Diriges The Army (監軍) and General Who Stabilises the South (安南將軍).

During his tenure, Huo Yi worked to pacify foreign customs, promoted fair legislation and educated the common people. Soon the region was prosperous and the resources whether they were rare or common became plentiful. The foreigners and Han citizens safe from danger. When the Jin dynasty succeeded Shu Han, Huo Yi was confirmed in his position. At the same time, the province of Jiaozhi was not yet conquered however Huo Yi received the rank of Inspector of Jiaozhi Province (交州刺史) to administrate it from afar and could nominate and appoint his own chief officials.

At the end of the year 263, the state of Cao Wei launched a campaign against Shu with the aim of vanquishing its rival state. Huo Yi along with the newly appointed commander of the Badong Commandery (巴東郡) Luo Xian did well in keeping order in their respective regions and led their officials to yield when they learned that Liu Shan surrender. Thanks to this reasonable conduct, both of them remained in their previous positions and received gifts and high praises from the capital.

When Huo Yi received news of the invasion, he wanted to lead troops from Nanzhong to assist in the defence of the Shu capital Chengdu, but Liu Shan already made his mind and rejected Huo Yi's suggestion then surrendered to the Wei general Deng Ai, bringing an end to the Shu regime. Huo Yi donned mourning garments and lamented greatly the fall of Shu for three days, after which his subordinates urged him to follow in his lord's footsteps by surrendering to Wei as well. Huo Yi refused to surrender and stated that he would fight to the death unless he was assured that Liu Shan was safe and was treated well after submitting to Wei.

He declared to them :

Upon receiving news that Liu Shan was not harmed and had moved from Chengdu to the Wei capital Luoyang, he officially surrendered to Wei, leading all the defensers of the six commanderies to dispatch a Memorial :"I your Servant, long I have head that the occurrences of the State take prominence over a man's life, that when a difficulty arose a loyal man should offer his life. However now that the State of your Servant is overwhelmed and his ruler submitted. I believe that a defence to the death would be pointless therefore we entrust and pledge to the new State to commit to his service with full resolution."

The Wei regent Sima Zhao was very pleased so he appointed Huo Yi as the Area Commander (都督) of Nanzhong and allowed the latter to remain in charge of Nanzhong. Huo Yi later sent troops to rescue Lü Xing (呂興) and successfully pacified the three commanderies of Jiaozhi (交阯), Rinan (日南) and Jiuzhen (九真). For his contributions, he received a marquis title and other rewards from the Wei imperial court. Huo Yi's grandson, Huo Biao (霍彪), served as the Administrator of Yuexi/Yuesui Commandery (越嶲郡) during the Jin dynasty.

Legacy
At the time the Huayang Guo Zhi is written (mid of the 4th century), the local officials still follow Huo Yi's example by being respectful of the traditions of the foreign tribes and merciful when judging them. After Huo Yi's death, his son Huo Zai (霍在) inherited the command of his soldiers and led them to establish peace with the leading clans of the south.

See also
 Lists of people of the Three Kingdoms

References

 Chen, Shou (3rd century). Records of the Three Kingdoms (Sanguozhi).
 Chang Qu (4th century). Chronicles of Huayang (Huayang Guo Zhi).
 Pei, Songzhi (5th century). Annotations to Records of the Three Kingdoms (Sanguozhi zhu).

Year of birth unknown
Year of death unknown
Shu Han generals
Shu Han politicians
Political office-holders in Yunnan
Jin dynasty (266–420) generals
Jin dynasty (266–420) politicians